Ocotea rugosa is a species of evergreen tree to  tall in the plant genus Ocotea, in the family Lauraceae. Its natural habitat is subtropical or tropical moist montane forests and cloud forest. This species requires moisture and protection of other trees for growing. The principal threats are fires, grazing, and the conversion of forest to farmland.

In Ecuador it is known from ten widely scattered populations, including the Parque Nacional Llanganates, Chillanes-El Tambo, Pichincha volcano, Guajalito river, Pululahua, Antisana and Cayambe-Coca reserves.

The fragrant flowers are whitish with a chalice tan. The fruit is half covered by a dome, like an acorn. The fruits are dark green.

References

rugosa
Endemic flora of Ecuador
Trees of Ecuador
Near threatened flora of South America
Taxonomy articles created by Polbot